The 2007 Lagos State gubernatorial election occurred on 14 April 2007. Babatunde Raji Fashola of the AC defeated other candidates, by polling 599,300 votes, PDP's Musiliu Olatunde Obanikoro was closest contender with 383,956 votes.

Babatunde Fashola emerged the ACN candidate at the gubernatorial primary election. His running mate was Sarah Adebisi Sosan.

Of the 22 candidates who contested in the governorship election, 20 were male, only two were female. Among the deputies, 18 were male, four were female.

Electoral system
The Governor of Lagos State is elected using the plurality voting system.

Primary election

PDP primary
The PDP governorship primary election was in the main bowl of the National Stadium Surulere, Lagos, on held on Saturday 9 December 2006, and lasted about 48 hours. There were 6,100 accredited delegates in attendance from across the state. Wife of the party's late gubernatorial aspirant Funsho Williams, Hilda Funsho-Williams, led with 2,597 votes; Senator Musiliu Obanikoro followed closely with 2,195 votes. Others like Engr. Kamson polled 683 votes, Senator Wahab Dosunmu had 253 votes, Prince Ademola Adeniji Adele got 190 votes, Engr. Adedeji Doherty got 73 votes, Chief Tunde Fanimokun polled 61 votes, Arch. Kayode Anibaba had 18 votes, Mrs. Abosede Oshinowo got 17 votes, and Sir Babatunde Olowu polled one vote. There were some voided votes. The Chairman of the Electoral Panel, Rear Admiral Babatunde Ogundele (rtd), according to Vanguard Nigeria, however, announced the failure of Funsho-Williams  to secure the required 50% win. It was Musiliu Obanikoro, however, who got to be nominated as the party's candidate.

Candidates 
 Party nominee: Musiliu Obanikoro
 Running mate:
 Hilda Funsho-Williams: de facto winner.
 Kamson
 Adedeji Doherty
 Wahab Dosunmu
 Babatunde Olowu
 Kayode Anibaba
 Ademola Adeniji Adele
 Abosede Oshinowo 
 Tunde Fanimokun

Results
A total of 22 candidates registered with the Independent National Electoral Commission to contest in the election. The AC candidate, Babatunde Fashola, won, defeating PDP' Musuliu Obanikoro, DPA's Jimi Agbaje, and 19 other minor party candidates. The total number of registered voters in the state was 4,204,000.

References 

Lagos State gubernatorial election
Lagos State gubernatorial election
Lagos State gubernatorial election
Lagos State gubernatorial elections